Pattanapravesham  is a 1988 Indian Malayalam-language detective comedy film directed by Sathyan Anthikad and written by Sreenivasan. It stars Mohanlal, Sreenivasan, Karamana Janardhanan Nair, Ambika and Thilakan in the lead roles. It is a sequel to the 1987 film Nadodikkattu, Mohanlal and Sreenivasan reprises their roles as Ramdas / Dasan and Vijayan, respectively. The plot follows Dasan and Vijayan who are now C.I.Ds in Tamil Nadu Police, who are charged with investigating a homicide case. The film was produced by Siyad Koker under the banner of Kokers Films.

Just six months after the events of the prequel, CIDs Ramdas and Vijayan are called to Kerala to solve the murder of a police officer. The two incompetent and clueless men find themselves facing a dangerous crime syndicate led by Prabhakaran Thampi (Karamana Janardanan Nair) that deals in drug trafficking. In addition, Anandan Nambiar (Thilakan), the man they put behind bars in Nadodikkattu escapes from jail. The film was a critical and commercial success. In 1990, Priyadarshan made a sequel titled Akkare Akkare Akkare.

Plot 

Ashoka Varma is a police officer trying to prevent smuggling. On the night he found the crucial evidence needed, he was murdered in his house. To find the murderer, Kerala Home Minister invites CID Ramdas / Dasan and Vijayan to Kerala.

On the day they arrived, CI takes them to their residence. They mistake Damu their cook for the murderer and beat him up. Due to Damu's injury, they take their supper in a hotel. In that hotel, Ramdas overhears a conversation and mistakes Isaac and Prof. Vidyadharan, two bird watchers, as the murderers. After the supper, Dasan and Vijayan walk along through streets and run into Isaac. When they try to follow him, they are shot at and ambushed by a group of villains and a fight breaks out. After the fight, they are saved by Prabhakaran Thampi, the real smuggler, who pretends to be a mill owner involved in a lot of social service projects. Prabhakaran Thampi advises Dasan and Vijayan to withdraw from the investigation told that there are many officers, who were investigating this case, have been murdered and that he does not want the duo to share their fare. Dasan and Vijayan are frightened but they put on a brave face before him.

Dasan and Vijayan decide to go undercover and start the investigation. With the help of Dasan's idea, they dress up as Mapilla umbrella repairmen. While investigating, an old woman gives them an umbrella to repair. They try to ask her about Isaac but she is not interested. They do a bad job in repairing the umbrella. At that time the woman's daughter-in-law Shobha arrives there and she spots Vijayan's fake beard and realizes that they are not genuine repairmen. Suspecting that they are thieves, the women raise the alarm and neighbours gather to catch the "thieves". The duo run away from there, leaving behind their repair kit.

After that failure, Vijayan and Dasan dress up as Tamil parrot Tarot diviners, based on Vijayan's idea. When they reach a bus station, Shobha too is there. She recognises them and alerts the other passengers that they are thieves. The local people get hold of the duo, and beat them up and take them to the police station. The CI reaches there and informs the local people that the duo are CID agents from Tamil Nadu. When the duo leaves the police station, Shobha apologises to them, and Ramdas accepts the apology.

After that day Ramdas arrives at Shobha's house and gives them a new umbrella as a replacement for the one he broke. Shobha gives him tea, but at that time he sees Isaac and runs after him, without drinking tea. He follows Isaac and finds his abode.

In the DIG's office, Dasan and Vijayan tell the officers that they have found the murderer and they will arrest him with all necessary proof. When they come out of the DIG's office they meet up with Prabhakaran Thampi who has come there to invite DIG for the stone-laying ceremony for a hospital. Thampi enquires about the investigation. The duo tells him that they are close to catching the culprits, who are masquerading as pillars of the society (referring to Isaac) and that they will unmask them. This frightens Prabhakaran Thampi. That night, when they return from the cinema, they are attacked by a masked man (Thampi's sidekick) in their house acting on the behest of Prabhakaran Thampi. They fight with him and take his mask from his face and one of his shoes, but he manages to escape from there, but unfortunately for them, Damu wears the mask.

The next day Ramdas and Vijayan go to Isaac's house. Vijayan dresses up and acts as a servant named Thankappan in front of Isaac, hoping to take his blood. But Issac does not allow him anywhere near the house. So Ramdas advises him to get employment in another house as a servant and in the night to sneak and take the blood of Isaac after knocking him out with chloroform. The neighbouring house happens to be Prabhakaran Thampi's house. When Prabhakaran Thampi arrives at the house, he does not recognize Vijayan, because of the disguise.

Ramdas visits Shobha and apologises for running away from their house the previous time. Shobha's mother in law tells him that her son Rajendran was murdered in an accident. Dasan asks Shobha about this. She tells him that her husband was murdered in a hit-and-run accident at check-post. However, she did not get any compensatory "dying-in-harness" job, because Rajendran died two days before completing the mandatory 2 years. He promises her that he will do his best to help her.

Meanwhile, at Thampi's house, Vijayan is caught in a power struggle between Thampi's wife and mother. Thampi's maid falls for Vijayan, who is annoyed by that. At night, Vijayan sneaks to get Isaac's blood but accidentally, inhales chloroform while sneezing.

At midnight, a mysterious figure arrives at Prabhakaran Thampi's house. Prabhakaran Thampi realizes that he is his old friend Anandan Nambiar. Years ago, acting together, Nambiar and Thampi had stolen some money from a Marwari businessman in Vijayawada and had invested their shares in crime and had thus become mafia dons. Nambiar had broken out from jail and wanted Thampi's help to escape. The next morning, Prabhakaran Thampi reads the news about Ananthan Nambiar and gets worried about this compromising him. Anandan Nambiar requests Prabhakaran Thampi to get him a fake passport. Prabhakaran Thampi tells him it won't be easy and suggest Anandan Nambiar hide in his copra warehouse.

Thampi's household maidservant continues to set her cap at Vijayan and flirts with him. Prabhakaran Thampi tells him to give his friend a lift on his bicycle and take him to the copra warehouse. Thampi's mother sees a disguised Ananthan Nambiar and Thampi introduces him as Ibrahim Kutty to his mother. Vijayan takes Ananthan Nambiar to the warehouse. Both Vijayan and Nambiar speak in falsetto and have doubts that they have met before, but both of them dismiss their doubts.

Dasan arrives at Prabhakaran Thampi's house. Prabhakaran Thampi is frightened to see him but welcomes him. They go upstairs. Dasan notices Isaac and begins to watch him. At that time, Vijayan arrives there with tea. He also tries to look but ends up dropping the tea. The tea falls over Thampi who beats him and calls him a rascal.

Vijayan comes back from Thampi's house, finds someone wearing the mask of the murderer and beats him. Dasan arrives, catches Vijayan and saves Damu who had been wearing the mask. Damu criticizes them for not finding any proof for the investigation. Vijayan shouts at Dasan for his lack of support at Prabhakaran Thampi's house. Vijayan tells Ramdas that he is going back to Madras (Chennai). Ramdas reveals to Vijayan that Ananthan Nambiar has broken out of jail and is searching for them. At that time, the phone rings and CI tells them that the Home minister is waiting for them. They arrive at a guest house. The Home minister asks them about their developments in the investigation. They tell him that they are observing the suspect from a distance. The Home minister criticizes them for not having carried out a proper investigation and threatens to have them cashiered should they will fail. Ramdas retorts to the Home Minister that he has also got a bone to pick about the treatment of SI Rajendran following his accident and reluctance of Govt. to give the job to his widow Shobha. He suggests that the Home Minister should first try to get her job and then criticize the investigation. They leave there in a huff.

Ramdas relates to Shobha all that has happened. Vijayan doubts Dasan and teases that he has fallen for Shobha. Dasan retaliates by taunting Vijayan for failing to obtain Isaac's blood. Ramdas challenges Vijayan and states that he will bring Isaac's blood without his help.

Dasan arrives at a hotel where Isaac and Prof. Vidyadharan have gone for lunch. Dasan tries to get Isaac's blood using a syringe, but manage to get only the waiter. Isaac tries to catch him but he escapes from there. Isaac recognizes Dasan, who has been following. He suspects that he came to steal his experimental details of bird watching.

Prabhakaran Thampi arrives at the copra warehouse and tells his man to start the drug-running from Idukki. His lorry rams down a check post gate and the police chase them. Meanwhile, Dasan tries to draw Isaac's blood when he is engaged in bird watching. Isaac beats Dasan and chases him but he escapes in his Jeep. At that time Thampi's lorry comes that way, Isaac jumps into the lorry and beats Thampi's men, throws them out and follows Ramdas. Dasan's jeep gets damaged and he sees Thampi's lorry and tries to stop it. When he gets into the lorry, Isaac beats him, but Dasan manages to escape because Issac is distracted by the sound of the bullfinch that he has been studying. The police arrive there and are under the impression that Dasan has single-handedly overpowered the goons and seized the ganja shipment. Realizing what is going on, Dasan acts the part.

Prabhakaran Thampi is shocked to hear the news about the seizure of his shipment and blames Ananthan Nambiar for all this. Thampi's man tells Nambiar that there is another way to go to Dubai without a passport. He introduces Gafoorka (Mamukkoya) to him, who, for a sum, is willing to redirect his cargo ship sailing to California via Dubai. Gafoorka advises Nambiar to dress up as an Arab and teaches him a few basic Arabic greetings.

Isaac and Prof. Vidyadharan plan to go after the elusive bullfinch which was observed on an island and by chance, their boarding point is exactly where Gafoorka plans to rendezvous with Nambiar. Dasan and Vijayan who follow Issac and Viyadharan, sees them getting on a boat and looks for the nearest boat which happens to be Gafoorka's. On seeing his nemeses approaching,  Nambiar jumps into the lagoon and escapes. Dasan and Vijayan catch Gafoorka and retrieve the money that they had been tricked into paying him, in the previous film.

Ananthan Nambiar informs Prabhakaran Thampi that the same CIDs who destroyed his mafia are the ones following him. Thampi blames Nambiar and asks his man Kunjukrishnan to smuggle Nambiar away from Kerala. He suggests to spirit Nambiar away in a lorry.

Ramdas requests Shobha to sign an application for her job. Nambiar was shocked to see the driver of the lorry, meant to take him away, was Puthanpurakkal Balan. He relates this to Prabhakaran Thampi and adds that Balan is a spy of CIDs. Prabhakaran Thampi decides to punish Balan who is dragged off the road by Thampi's goons, beaten up and kidnapped and presented by Kunjukrishnan before Nambiar. Balan mistakes Nambiar for a Swami. Nambiar threatens him for being a spy. Balan understands what's going on. Nambiar orders Balan to kill Dasan and Vijayan and threatens to kill his family should he disobey. Balan goes to Dasan and Vijayan's home and Damu fights with him. He is rescued by Dasan and tells Vijayan that he will stay with them.

Prabhakaran Thampi and Ananthan Nambiar are in the house. Nambiar sees Isaac watching through binoculars. He frightens Prabhakaran Thampi and tells him that he is also a CID spy. Prabhakaran Thampi says he is a poor man who started living some days before. Nambiar reminds Prabhakaran Thampi of that one who caught his ganja lorry who is bald and fat. This frightens Prabhakaran Thampi and goes to watch him. He also misunderstood Issac as a CID spy. Isaac has a suitcase. Thampi and Nambiar decide to catch it, misunderstanding it as evidence against them.

At night Balan tries to kill Dasan and Vijayan while they are sleeping. But he fails to do that. Dasan finds it and is shocked. Vijayan wakes up and tells Dasan that he already told him that Balan is mad. Balan tells them, if he couldn't kill them then he will lose his family, that Ananthan Nambiar threatened him. Dasan and Vijayan are shocked to hear the news of Nambiar. They realise that Nambiar is nearby. Balan tells them about the half-bald man, he says is Kunjukrishnan but Dasan thinks it is Isaac. Dasan and Vijayan decide to rescue Balan's family.

The next morning, Kunjukrishnan takes away the suitcase from Isaac's hand. Isaac and Prof. Vidyadharan chase him. Dasan and Vijayan along with Balan also chase them. They reach Prabhakaran Thampi's coconut farm warehouse. Vijayan and Balan recognise the place. While Isaac tries to retrieve the suitcase, Dasan and Vijayan try to beat Isaac. Dasan and Vijayan realise that Prabhakaran Thampi and Ananthan Nambiar are friends and there begins a fight. Balan tells Dasan and Vijayan that Isaac is not the bald man who threatened him. Dasan and Vijayan ask Isaac who he is. He says that he is a bird watcher. After that, they begin to fight together against Kunjukrishnan and the gang. Vijayan informs the police. CI arrives there with the police. Dasan and Vijayan find gold from the warehouse. Prabhakaran Thampi, Ananthan Nambiar and their gang get arrested.

Dasan arrives at Shobha's house and gives her the appointment letter of her job.

The home minister thanks Ramdas and Vijayan for their hard work in finding the culprits and saving his seat. Ramdas also apologises to Isaac for misunderstanding him. Isaac says never mind since it was for a good cause. The film ends by showing  Dasan and Vijayan leaving for  Tamil Nadu.

Cast 

 Mohanlal as CID Ramdas / Dasan
 Sreenivasan as CID Vijayan / Thankappan
 Karamana Janardanan Nair as Prabhakaran Thampi / Copra Prabhakaran 
 Thilakan as Ananthan Nambiar / IbrahimKutty
 N. L. Balakrishnan as Isaac (Bird watcher 1)
 Innocent as Puthenpurackal Balan / Balettan
 Ambika as Shobha
 K. P. A. C. Lalitha as Shobha's mother-in-law
 Paravoor Bharathan as Prof. Vidyadharan (Bird watcher 2)
 Philomina as Prabhakaran Thampi's mother
 Rashid as Kunjukrishnan
 Azeez as Circle Inspector Santhosh
 Valsala Menon as Home Minister's wife
 Mamukkoya as Gafoorka
 Mala Aravindan as Damu
 Prathapachandran as DySP. Ashoka Varma
 Oduvil Unnikrishnan as Home Minister Aravindakshan
 Thodupuzha Vasanthi as Prabhakaran Thampi's wife
 Aloor Elsy as Prabhakaran Thampi's servant
 Nuhein Hassier as Shobha's son

Soundtrack 
The film features songs composed by  Shyam, with lyrics by Yusufali Kechery.

References

External links
 

1988 films
1980s Malayalam-language films
Films with screenplays by Sreenivasan
Indian sequel films
DasanVijayan2
Films shot in Kochi
Films directed by Sathyan Anthikad